Waritai is a Lakes Plain language of Irian Jaya, Indonesia. It is spoken in Taiyeve.

References

Lakes Plain languages
Languages of western New Guinea